Bazyli Wójtowicz (2 April 1899 – 3 April 1985) was a Polish sculptor. His work was part of the sculpture event in the art competition at the 1936 Summer Olympics.

References

External links
 

1899 births
1985 deaths
20th-century Polish sculptors
Polish male sculptors
20th-century male artists
Olympic competitors in art competitions
People from Krosno County